Patty Fendick was the defending champion but did not compete that year.

Kumiko Okamoto won in the final 6–4, 6–2 against Elizabeth Smylie.

Seeds
A champion seed is indicated in bold text while text in italics indicates the round in which that seed was eliminated.

  Anne Minter (semifinals)
  Belinda Cordwell (semifinals)
  Ann Henricksson (second round)
  Sandra Wasserman (quarterfinals)
  Etsuko Inoue (quarterfinals)
  Betsy Nagelsen (quarterfinals)
  Monique Javer (second round)
  Louise Allen (first round)

Draw

External links
 1989 Suntory Japan Open Tennis Championships Draw

Singles